Ningbingia is a genus of land snails in the family Camaenidae. This genus is endemic to Kimberley in Western Australia.

Ningbingia is differentiated from other genera by the morphology of the penis. Species in the genus have shells of average size with raised spires.

Species 
Species include:
 Ningbingia australis
 Ningbingia bulla
 Ningbingia dentiens
 Ningbingia laurina
 Ningbingia octava
 Ningbingia res

References

External links
 Nomenclator Zoologicus

 
Camaenidae
Fauna of Western Australia
Taxonomy articles created by Polbot